Cyerce is a genus of sacoglossan sea slugs, a shell-less marine opisthobranch gastropod mollusks in the family Caliphyllidae.

Species 
 Cyerce antillensis Engel, 1927
 Cyerce bourbonica Yonow, 2012 
 Cyerce cristallina (Trinchese, 1881)
 Cyerce edmundsi Thompson, 1977
 Cyerce elegans Bergh, 1870
 Cyerce graeca Thompson T., 1988
 Cyerce habanensis Ortea & Templado, 1988
 Cyerce kikutarobabai Hamatani, 1976
 Cyerce nigra Bergh, 1871
 Cyerce nigricans (Pease, 1866)
 Cyerce orteai Valdés & Camacho-Garcia, 2000
 Cyerce pavonina Bergh, 1888
 Cyerce verdensis Ortea & Templado, 1990

References

External links 

Caliphyllidae